The Greenup Masonic Lodge, located at	314 Main St. in Greenup, Kentucky, is a three-story brick building constructed in 1867.  It was listed on the National Register of Historic Places in 1988.

It is a combination Masonic lodge hall and commercial building.  It was deemed notable "as Greenup's best exampie of how Greek Revival and Italianate stylistic elements were combined to create impressive commercial buildings after the Civil War."  It was built for the Greenup Masonic Lodge, which was organized in 1827.  The lodge incorporated in 1868 in order to build the building.

It has also been known as Leslie's Drugstore.

References

Clubhouses on the National Register of Historic Places in Kentucky
Greek Revival architecture in Kentucky
Italianate architecture in Kentucky
Masonic buildings completed in 1867
National Register of Historic Places in Greenup County, Kentucky
Masonic buildings in Kentucky
1867 establishments in Kentucky
Commercial buildings on the National Register of Historic Places in Kentucky